Arlo Guthrie is a 1974 album by the folk singer Arlo Guthrie.

Track listing
All tracks composed by Arlo Guthrie; except where indicated

 "Won't Be Long"
 "Presidential Rag"
 "Deportees" (Woody Guthrie, Martin Hoffman)
 "Children of Abraham"
 "Nostalgia Rag"
 "When the Cactus Is in Bloom" (Jimmie Rodgers)
 "Me and My Goose"
 "Bling Blang" (Woody Guthrie, from Songs to Grow on for Mother and Child)
 "Go Down Moses" (traditional, arranged by Arlo Guthrie)
 "Hard Times"
 "Last to Leave"

Personnel

Byron Berline - Fiddle
George Bohanon - Arranger
Roger Bush - Bass
Bob Cato - Unknown Contributor Role
James Cleveland - Choir Master
Ry Cooder - Guitar
Jesse Ed Davis - Guitar
Nick DeCaro - Accordion, Strings
Doug Dillard - Banjo
Buddy Emmons - Pedal Steel Guitar
Chris Ethridge - Bass
Wilton Felder - Unknown Contributor Role
Barry Feldman - Executive Producer
Jim Gordon - Drums
Arlo Guthrie - Guitar, Vocals
Lee Herschberg - Engineer
Milt Holland - Unknown Contributor Role
Jim Keltner - Drums
Clydie King - Vocals
Donn Landee - Engineer
Judy Maizel - Assistant Producer
Thomas Molesky - Design
Spooner Oldham - Keyboards
John Pilla - Guitar, Photography, Producer
Jessica Smith - Vocals
Southern California Community Choir - Choir/Chorus
Lenny Waronker - Producer

References

Arlo Guthrie albums
1974 albums
Albums produced by Lenny Waronker
Reprise Records albums
Rising Son Records albums